Sotades (3rd century BC) was an Ancient Greek poet.

Sotades was born in Maroneia, either the one in Thrace, or in Crete. He lived in Alexandria during the reign of Ptolemy II Philadelphus (285–246 BC). The city was at that time a remarkable center of learning, with a great deal of artistic and literary activity, including epic poetry and the Great Library. Only a few genuine fragments of his work have been preserved; those in Stobaeus are generally considered spurious. Ennius translated some poems of this kind, included in his book of satires under the name of Sola. He had a son named Apollonius.  He has been credited with the invention of the palindrome.

Sotades was the chief representative of the writers of obscene and even pederastic satirical poems, called "kinaidoi", composed in the Ionic dialect and in the metre named after him.  
One of his poems attacked Ptolemy II Philadelphus's marriage to his own sister Arsinoe II, from which came the infamous line: "You're sticking your prick in an unholy hole." For this, Sotades was imprisoned, but he escaped to the island of Caunus, where he was afterwards captured by the admiral Patroclus, shut up in a leaden chest, and thrown into the sea. 

British Orientalist and explorer Sir Richard Francis Burton (1821–1890) hypothesised the existence of a "Sotadic zone". He asserted that there exists a geographic zone in which pederasty is prevalent and celebrated among the indigenous inhabitants, and named it after Sotades.

References

External links
Sotades from the Wiki Classical Dictionary
Sotades (2) from Smith, Dictionary of Greek and Roman Biography and Mythology (1867)

Ancient Greek poets
Ancient Thracian Greeks
Cynic philosophers
Erotic poetry
Greek erotica writers
Greek male writers
Obscenity
Palindromists
Pederasty in ancient Greece
Pornography
3rd-century BC Greek people
3rd-century BC poets
People of the Ptolemaic Kingdom
People from Maroneia